Gerhard Müller may refer to:

Theologians

 Gerhard Müller (Lutheran theologian) (born 1929), German Lutheran theologian
  (1940–2016), German Catholic theologian and priest
 Gerhard Ludwig Müller (born 1947), German Catholic cardinal and Prefect Emeritus of the Congregation for the Doctrine of the Faith

Other people

 Gerhard Friedrich Müller (1705–1783), historian and pioneer ethnologist
 Gerhard Mueller (engineer) (1835–1918), or Müller, New Zealand surveyor, engineer and land commissioner
 Gerhard Müller (rower) (born c. 1930s), German rower
 Gerhard Müller (geophysicist) (1940–2002), German geophysicist

See also 
 Gerard Muller (1861–1929), Dutch Impressionist painter
 Gerd Müller (disambiguation)